The Tarikhaneh Mosque, is a Sassanid-era monument located on the southern limit of the present day city of Damghan, Iran.

History

This temple was in the pre-Islamic place of worship of the Zoroastrian and used it as a fire or temple of fire, and is about 2,300 years old.
This structure was initially used as a Zoroastrian Fire Temple during the Sassanid period, however, after the fall of the Sassanid Empire it was converted into a mosque in the 8th century. The monument is, thus, known as the oldest mosque in Iran.

Etymology
"Tarikhaneh" is derived from tari ("god") and khaneh ("home"), thus meaning "god's home". Other names like Tarik Khaneh (Dark House) are false.

Architecture and design
This place was in the pre-Islamic place of worship of the Zoroastrians and used it as a fire or temple of fire, and is about 2,300 years old.

Before the arrival of Islam to Iran and the Qomes area, the people of this city used this place as the ritual of religious ceremonies of Zoroastrian religion.

The main plan consists of a square courtyard which is surrounded by arcades of barrel vaults supported by slightly pointed fired brick arches set on rather stumpy circular pillars, typical of the Sassanid architecture. The pillars are 3.5 meters tall and almost 2 meters in diameter.

Standing together at a distance from the mosque are the remains of a square column of uncertain date, possibly part of the original construction period, and a cylindrical minaret from the Seljuk period. The latter was built in 1026–1029 to replace an older 9th century minaret, and is strikingly divided into six zones of ornamentation, each rendered in brick with a different geometric pattern. The minaret is 4.2 meters in diameter; its top has fallen, but originally it must have measured more the 30 meters high, with a gallery supported on muqarnas corbels.

Gallery

References

External links 
Wikimapia Entry
Tarikhaneh Images

Buildings and structures in Semnan Province
Fire temples
Mosques in Iran
Fire temples in Iran
Sasanian architecture
National works of Iran